Pamela Kelly-Flowers, a native of Columbia, Louisiana is a former American women's basketball player at Louisiana Tech University. She won two national championships for the Lady Techsters. She was named to the All-American team in 1980, 1981, and 1982, her school's only three-time All-American. Kelly won the 1982 Wade Trophy and the 1982 Honda Sports Award for basketball, awards presented annually to the best women's basketball player in the National Collegiate Athletic Association. She was enshrined as a charter member into the Louisiana Tech Athletic Hall of Fame in 1984, and her #41 jersey was retired. She was inducted in 1992 into the Louisiana Sports Hall of Fame.

She was inducted into the Women's Basketball Hall of Fame in 2007.

Kelly is married to Nathan Flowers Sr., and the couple has two sons. Her son John Flowers is a professional basketball player.

Louisiana Tech statistics
Source

Awards and honors

 1982—Winner of the Broderick Award (now the Honda Sports Award) for basketball
 1982—Wade Trophy

References

Year of birth missing (living people)
Living people
All-American college women's basketball players
American women's basketball players
Basketball players from Louisiana
Louisiana Tech Lady Techsters basketball players
People from Columbia, Louisiana